"Out of Tears" is a song by English rock band the Rolling Stones featured on their 1994 album, Voodoo Lounge. It was released as the album's third single. The song was moderately successful, reaching the top 40 in several countries, but was a successful follow-up to "Love Is Strong" in Canada, peaking at  3 on the RPM Top Singles chart for six consecutive weeks.

Description and history
The song was recorded in 1993 and 1994 at Ronnie Wood's Ireland home, Sandymount Studios, and A&M Recording Studios in Los Angeles. The song features Mick Jagger on lead vocals and acoustic guitar, Wood and Keith Richards on electric guitars, Wood performs the guitar solo, Charlie Watts on drums, Darryl Jones on bass, Chuck Leavell on piano, Benmont Tench on organ, and percussion by Lenny Castro.

The song is credited to Jagger and Richards, but is largely the work of Jagger. According to Jagger: "I used to say, 'Now we're writing songs. I'm gonna sit at my desk.' 'Out of Tears' was a little bit like that, where I'm sitting at the piano in Ronnie [Wood]'s studio going 'Da da ding, da da ding.' Then you go and listen to it, and it's got this really good mood because it's you on your own. No one else is there, and you're creating the mood. There's a very sad mood to that song. The Stones are mainly a guitar band, but I think with a ballad sometimes it's nice to move away from that. And when a song is written on a keyboard, you get a different sort of melodic structure."

Track listings
UK, Australian, and Japanese CD single
 "Out of Tears" (Don Was edit) – 4:21
 "I'm Gonna Drive" – 3:41
 "Sparks Will Fly" (radio clean) – 3:14
 "Out of Tears" (Bob Clearmountain remix edit) – 4:21

UK 7-inch and cassette single, European CD single
 "Out of Tears" (Don Was edit) – 4:21
 "I'm Gonna Drive" – 3:41

US and Canadian maxi-CD single
 "Out of Tears" (Don Was edit) – 4:12
 "Out of Tears" (Bob Clearmountain remix edit) – 4:12
 "I'm Gonna Drive" – 3:41
 "So Young" – 3:20

US 7-inch and cassette single
A1. "Out of Tears" (Don Was edit) – 4:12
B1. "Out of Tears" (Bob Clearmountain remix edit) – 4:12
B2. "I'm Gonna Drive" – 3:41

Charts

Weekly charts

Year-end charts

References

External links
 Song lyrics

1994 singles
1994 songs
Music videos directed by Jake Scott (director)
The Rolling Stones songs
Song recordings produced by Don Was
Song recordings produced by Jagger–Richards
Songs written by Jagger–Richards
Virgin Records singles